Tadeusz Synowiec (11 November 1889 in Świątniki Górne – 7 November 1960 in Kędzierzyn) was a Polish football player, midfielder and forward, later a coach and journalist, graduate of Kraków’s Jagiellonian University.

All career played for the team of Cracovia, also was captain of Polish National Team in the historic, first game against Hungary (Budapest, December 21, 1921). Also was captain of Cracovia, where, in the years 1910-1924, played in 318 games.

After finishing career became a coach and a journalist. Was the first editor-in-chief of Polish sports daily Przeglad Sportowy. On August 30, 1925 took the post of coach of Poland, replaced in June 1927 by Stefan Loth.

Tadeusz Synowiec was son of Stanisław Synowiec (1859-1908), a locksmith, and Józefa née Bania. He got three siblings - sisters Waleria (1884-1945) and Otylia (1906-1907) and brother Józef (1886-1945).

He was born in Świątniki Górne near Wieliczka.

In school year 1918/1919 he was a teacher in the Polish school in Ostróg.

In 1947 he was a chairman of Silesian Football Association (Śląski Związek Piłki Nożnej), a branch of Polish Football Association. Since 1959 Synowiec lived in Kędzierzyn. He died on November 7, 1960 in Kędzierzyn and was buried on the Rakowicki Cemetery in Kraków.

References

External links
Tadeusz Synowiec in KS Cracovia online encyclopedia

1889 births
1960 deaths
Jagiellonian University alumni
Polish footballers
Polish football managers
Poland international footballers
Olympic footballers of Poland
Footballers at the 1924 Summer Olympics
Footballers from Kraków
Polish Austro-Hungarians
People from the Kingdom of Galicia and Lodomeria
MKS Cracovia (football) players
Association football midfielders
Poland national football team managers
People from Kraków County
Burials at Rakowicki Cemetery